Ricci is an Italian surname, derived from the adjective "riccio", meaning curly.

Notable Riccis

Arts and entertainment
 Antonio Ricci (painter) (c.1565–c.1635), Spanish Baroque painter of Italian origin
 Christina Ricci (born 1980), American actress
 Federico Ricci (1809–77), Italian composer
 Franco Maria Ricci (1937–2020), Italian art publisher
 Italia Ricci (born 1986), Canadian actress
 Jason Ricci (born 1974), American blues harmonica player
 Lella Ricci (1850–71), Italian singer
 Luigi Ricci (1805–59), Italian composer
 Luigi Ricci (1893–1981), Italian vocal coach
 Luigi Ricci-Stolz (1852–1906), Italian composer
 Marco Ricci (1676–1730), Italian Baroque painter
 Nahéma Ricci, Canadian actress
 Nina Ricci (designer) (1883–1970), French fashion designer
 Nino Ricci (born 1959), Canadian novelist
 Regolo Ricci (born 1955), Canadian painter and illustrator
 Ruggiero Ricci (1918–2012), American violinist
 Sebastiano Ricci (1659–1734), Venetian Baroque painter
 Stefano Ricci (sculptor) (1765–1837), Italian sculptor
 Ulysses Ricci (1888–1960), American architectural sculptor

Mathematics
 Giovanni Ricci (mathematician) (1904–1973), Italian mathematician
 Gregorio Ricci-Curbastro (1853–1925), Italian mathematician (Ricci curvature)
 Michelangelo Ricci (1619–82), Italian Cardinal and mathematician 
 Ostilio Ricci (1540–1603), Italian mathematician

Religion
 Arcasio Ricci (1590–1636), Roman Catholic Bishop
 Lorenzo Ricci (1703–75), 18th Superior General of the Jesuits
 Matteo Ricci (1552–1610), Jesuit Major General who led missions into China
 Michelangelo Ricci (1619–82), Italian Cardinal and mathematician
 Regolo Ricci (born 1955), Canadian painter and illustrator

Sport
 Austin Ricci (born 1996), Canadian soccer player
 Christie Ricci (born 1982), American wrestler
 Donatella Ricci (born 1963), Italian sport pilot and astrophysicist
 Fausto Ricci (born 1961), Italian motorcycle racer
 Francesco Ricci Bitti (born 1942), Italian sports administrator
 Giampaolo Ricci (born 1991), Italian basketball player
 Giovanni Ricci (American football) (born 1996), American football player
 Mike Ricci (born 1971), Canadian ice hockey player
 Renato Ricci (Australian footballer) (born 1940), Australian footballer
 Renato Ricci (Italian footballer) (born 1991), Italian footballer
 Sandro Ricci (born 1974), Brazilian football referee
 Secondo Ricci (1913–1984), Italian footballer

Other
 Kenn Ricci (fl.1981–2015), aviation entrepreneur
 Lawrence Ricci (1945–2005), Genovese family capo
 Matteo Ricci (disambiguation), multiple people
Matteo Ricci (footballer, born February 1994), Italian football goalkeeper
Matteo Ricci (footballer, born May 1994), Italian football midfielder
Matteo Ricci (politician) (born 1972), Italian politician
 Nina Ricci (designer) (1883–1970), French fashion designer
 Renato Ricci (1896–1956), Italian Fascist politician
 Umberto Ricci (1879–1946), Italian academic and economist

Given name
 Ricci Crisostomo (born 1975), Filipino actor
 Ricci Greenwood (born 1973), American footballer
 Ricci Harnett (born 1975), English actor

See also
 13642 Ricci, asteroid named after Gregorio Ricci-Curbastro
 Colégio Mateus Ricci, Roman Catholic primary and secondary school in Macau
 Matteo Ricci College, Jesuit college program that is affiliated with Seattle University
 Ricci v. DeStefano, 2009 U.S. court case concerning affirmative action
 Nina Ricci (brand), fashion house founded by Nina Ricci

Italian-language surnames